The United States deputy secretary of labor is the second-highest-ranking official in the United States Department of Labor. In the United States federal government, the deputy secretary oversees the day-to-day operation of the Department of Labor, and may act as secretary of labor during the absence of the secretary.  The deputy secretary is appointed by the President of the United States with the advice and consent of the United States Senate and the United States Senate Committee on Health, Education, Labor, and Pensions.

List of deputy secretaries of labor
The following is a list of deputy secretaries of labor or earlier equivalent positions.

References

External links 
 

Labor